The term ramshorn snail or ram's horn snail is used in two different ways. In the aquarium trade it is used to describe various kinds of freshwater snails whose shells are planispiral, meaning that the shell is a flat coil.  Such shells resemble a coil of rope, or (as the name suggests) a ram's horn. In a more general natural history context, the term "ramshorn snails" is used more precisely to mean those aquatic pulmonate gastropod mollusks in the family Planorbidae that have planispiral coiled shells.

Ramshorn snails have been bred for the aquarium trade and various color forms have been selected. The two species commonly found in aquariums are Planorbella duryi and Planorbarius corneus, both in the family Planorbidae. One species (Columbia ramshorn, Marisa cornuarietis) is from a totally different family, the Ampullariidae.

Ramshorn snails can sometimes become a nuisance in an aquarium, because some of them breed so profusely.

Description

Most of these snails are of the family Planorbidae, and they include the species Planorbarius corneus.  There are two different coloured skin forms: black and red; the latter lack the dark skin pigment melanin and consequently have a bright reddish skin, which is the colour of their blood. Their blood contains red hemoglobin, unlike other snails' blood, which contains greenish hemocyanin.

These ramshorn snails breathe air.  Although most of them are extremely small, some may reach a size of two and a half centimeters (one inch).  The shells range from translucent through various shades of brown to a dark, nearly black color.  The dark color appears to originate from dietary materials not generally available in the home aquarium, although many varieties from ponds are this dark shade.

There are two common skin colourations: black and red. The red colouration is the colour of their blood (containing hemoglobin), unlike other snails with green blood (due to hemocyanin). An absence of melanin reveals the red colour. Rare varieties have been selectively bred in pale pink and blue. These traits are recessive and if crossbred the resultant offspring are likely to be wild type (brown).

Snails of this family are spiralled sinistrally, with the opening hole slanted downward toward the right.  Large folds of skin may protrude out of the more open left side.  Like all air-breathing water snails, the animal has no operculum, and has only one pair of tentacles with the eye spots at the base of the tentacles. Ramshorn snails have a lifespan of one year.

Breeding 
Ramshorn snails are hermaphroditic; two organisms of any sex have the ability to breed and produce offspring.

Ramshorn snails lay eggs in globules, which tend to be brownish in color. The globules contain about a dozen or so eggs, though it can vary. The globules are translucent, so it is possible to visually see the new snails develop in size. The newborn snails are clearish white.

Interaction with environment

Ramshorn snails generally will eat only the most delicate plants, preferring algae, uneaten fish food, and dead fish.  Some varieties do particularly enjoy eating the leaves of stem plants such as cabomba and anacharis.

Some aquarium species will eat ramshorn snails.  More voracious eaters include puffers, loaches (such as the clown loach or any other member of the genus Botia), crayfish, and most gouramis— though many other fish will also consume snail meat. Apple snails and assassin snails will also prey upon ramshorn snails.

Good fish roommates for snails include, but are not limited to, danios, guppies, White Cloud Mountain minnows, neon tetras, and cory catfish. All of these are non-aggressive fish that cohabit easily with snails.

One should also be aware that pond-reared red ramshorn snails are able to carry various parasitic flukes, which can be transmitted to fish, or humans.  Most of these flukes require intermediate hosts, so that leaving the snails in a fish-free aquarium for a month or so will eliminate any parasites.

If the population is kept to a manageable size, ramshorn snails can be good tank cleaners. They eat algae and dead or dying plants generally, so they can be useful. However, if they breed too prolifically they can become a nuisance. In warm climates (such as those in mainland Australia or the southern United States) they much prefer ponds, especially outdoor ponds. Algae, dead leaves that sink to the bottom, mulm and dead animals can be a problem, as they foul the water. Ramshorn snails eat all of these things.

Role as aquarium pest
Most ramshorn snails are considered minor aquarium pests.  They may arrive in a tank as egg bundles hidden in newly acquired plants.  Although their red color may make them somewhat interesting aquarium subjects, their hermaphroditic ability to breed prolifically from any two specimens can make them troublesome.  Absolute eradication is difficult, but their numbers can usually be kept to a moderate level. Common methods to reduce population include treating plants to prevent introduction, various manual methods of control, introducing the snail-eating animals listed earlier, and poisoning the snails.

Soaking the plants in various chemicals may kill off the snails and their eggs.  A 10-minute bath in a solution of 20 parts water to 1 part chlorine bleach has been suggested for hardier plants, followed by soaking in water containing a dechlorinating agent.  A more gentle treatment calls for 5–10 tablespoons of alum to 1 gallon of water for 2–3 days.  A safer alternative may be placing the plants in a quarantine tank, and adding snail poisons to that tank rather than the main show tank.

Manual methods include baiting the snails with lettuce (run it under hot water first and leave overnight), cucumber slices, or food pellets.  These may be left out in the open, and removed with their snails, or kept in some container, such as a film canister weighed down with a pebble, and containing holes drilled in it.  Crushing the snails by hand as they appear can also effectively limit their population; most ramshorn shells are fragile enough that this is quite easily done.

Introducing animals to control a snail population can require some thought.  Other aquarium fish may not be compatible, and some larger adult snails may be too big to be eaten by smaller snail eating species.  It may occasionally be necessary to crush a few snails manually so that the fish realize the snail can be eaten.  Snail eating species also do not usually discriminate between different types of snails, although this is usually not much of a concern.

Snail poisons are generally considered to be a last resort, as most of them are copper-based and are potentially toxic to plants and fish and particularly dangerous to other invertebrates.  Even new safer chemicals that do not harm the other aquarium inhabitants may cause damage if large numbers of dead snails are allowed to decompose.  For this reason, it is best to reduce the snail population by other means as much as possible before resorting to poisons, and to do frequent water changes afterwards.  Some also recommend adding ammonium protection to the tank.  Zeolite chips, and various liquid products such as amquel may help in this area.

"Giant ramshorn" snails
Totally unrelated to these ramshorn snails is the species Marisa cornuarietis, which is often sold at pet stores under the name "Columbian ramshorn" or "giant ramshorn" snail.  This species is actually a kind of apple snail, albeit one with a planispiral shell.  They are distinguished by having an operculum by which they can close themselves into their shell, two pairs of tentacles, separate genders, and a siphon on the left side.

Its shell is yellowish, with brown stripes running the length of the shell.  These apple snails lay gelatinous masses of eggs on submerged portions of plants.  They can grow to up to four centimeters in size.  They generally will not become a pest, although they can consume large amounts of plant matter. They are very large compared to other Ramshorn snails.

References

External links
Ramshorn Snails on The Aquarium Wiki

Planorbidae
Mollusc common names